Nirbhay Pal Sharma  was an Indian politician and member of the 09th, 12th and the 13th Legislative Assembly of Uttar Pradesh of India. Sharma represented the Sarsawa constituency of Uttar Pradesh (which is now called Behat (Assembly constituency)) and was a member of the BJP political party. Sharma was murdered on 5 November 2000 at his residence in Saharanpur.

Personal life
Nirbhay Pal Sharma was born in Saharanpur.

Political career
Nirbhay Pal Sharma had been in active politics since 1970s. He was a MLA for three terms. During the 09th and the 12th Legislative Assembly of Uttar Pradesh he was a member of the Indian National Congress whereas during the 13th Legislative Assembly  he was a member of the Bharatiya Janata Party.

Elections Contested

Murder
On 5 November 2000, Sharma's residence in Officers Colony in Saharanpur was attacked by armed assailants allegedly belonging to the Bawaria tribe. Allegedly the attackers remained at his residence for 30 minutes and killed Sharma. It was also alleged that Nirbhay Sharma had called the police but the police did not respond on time.

Posts Held

See also

 Behat (Assembly constituency)
 Sarsawa (Assembly constituency)
 Uttar Pradesh Legislative Assembly
 Government of India
 Politics of India
 Bharatiya Janata Party
 Indian National Congress

References 

Uttar Pradesh MLAs 1985–1989
Uttar Pradesh MLAs 1993–1996
Uttar Pradesh MLAs 1997–2002
Bharatiya Janata Party politicians from Uttar Pradesh
Indian National Congress (Organisation) politicians
People from Saharanpur district
2000 deaths
Year of birth missing